The Nevada–California Power Company Substation and Auxiliary Power Building is an industrial building in Tonopah, Nevada. Built in 1905, it provided electricity to the town and the surrounding mine operations. The building was used by the Nevada–California Power Company, a predecessor of Southern California Edison.

The building was constructed with detailing befitting its significant role in the community.

The substation was listed on the National Register of Historic Places in 1982.

References

Tonopah, Nevada
Buildings and structures in Nye County, Nevada
Energy infrastructure completed in 1905
Industrial buildings and structures on the National Register of Historic Places in Nevada
Energy infrastructure on the National Register of Historic Places
National Register of Historic Places in Tonopah, Nevada
Southern California Edison
1905 establishments in Nevada